Sungai Durian, or "Durian River", is a village in the district of Lamposi Tigo Nagari, Payakumbuh, in the province of West Sumatra, Indonesia.
The village had 2,100 inhabitants as of the 2010 census.

In December 2016 Payakumbuh mayor Riza Falepi and Member of Parliament Lampasi Syafrizal visited the village to inspect land where a football stadium was planned, with construction to start in 2018.

Notes

Sources

Populated places in West Sumatra